is a Japanese theater located at Chayamachi Applause in Chayamachi, Kita-ku, Osaka, operated by Umeda Arts Theater Co., Ltd. It opened in 1992.

Umeda Arts Theater Co., Ltd. is a member of Hankyu Hanshin Toho Group and a subsidiary of Hankyu Corporation. It serves as a theater producing company and a talent agency for former Takarazuka Revue Company stars, with branches in Tokyo and New York. Umeda Arts Theater has produced the world premiere of Prince of Broadway, a musical retrospective celebrating the 21-time Tony winner Harold Prince, directed by Prince and Susan Stroman.

Venues
Main Hall: 1,905 seats 
Theater Drama City: 898 seats

Access
Hankyu Umeda Station - approx. 3 minutes from Chayamachiguchi Gate on foot
JR West Osaka Station - approx. 8 minutes from Midosuji North Gate on foot
Osaka Municipal Subway
Midosuji Line - approx. 5 minutes from Exit 1 of Umeda Station on foot, approx. 4 minutes from Exit 4 of Nakatsu Station
Tanimachi Line - approx. 7 minutes from Exit 1 of Higashi-Umeda Station on foot
Yotsubashi Line - approx. 11 minutes from Exit 3 of Nishi-Umeda Station on foot
Hanshin Umeda Station - approx. 10 minutes from East Exit on foot

References

External links
 Official website 

Theatres in Japan
Concert halls in Japan
Tourist attractions in Osaka
Buildings and structures in Osaka
Hankyu Hanshin Holdings
1992 establishments in Japan
Umeda
Theatres completed in 1992